Blepharotes  is a genus of robber fly in the family Asilidae. Its members are found in Eastern Australia. They include the giant yellow robber fly Blepharotes coriarius, and B. splendidissimus.

Asilidae genera
Diptera of Australasia